Cache Cœur Naïf is an EP by German electronica band Mouse on Mars. It was released in 1997 on Too Pure Records, Thrill Jockey Records and Rough Trade Records. It was recorded in collaboration with British band Stereolab, which had also co-created their album Dots and Loops and the Miss Modular EP with Mouse on Mars.

Track listing
All tracks (except 4) have Laetitia Sadier on vocals, track 1 has Mary Hansen on backing vocals.
 "Cache Cœur Naïf" – 3:20
 "Schnick-Schnack" – 6:00
 "Lazergum" – 3:38
 "Glim" – 6:01

Credits 
Taken from the source:
Eric Bernaud – turntables
Dinah Frank – photography
Mary Hansen – vocals (Background)
London Too Pure – engineer
Frieda Luczak – art direction, artwork
Mouse on Mars – arranger, composer, primary Artist, producer
Laetitia Sadier – vocals

References

1997 EPs
Mouse on Mars albums
Rough Trade Records EPs
Thrill Jockey EPs